Brian Connaughton may refer to:

 Brian Connaughton (Scott Medal recipient) (1899–1983), Garda (Irish policeman)
 Brian Connaughton (cyclist) (born 1942/43), cyclist and Garda
 Brian Connaughton (philosopher), professor and scholar at Universidad Autónoma Metropolitana